Archidium is a genus of mosses; it is the only genus in the family Archidiaceae and order Archidiales.

Classification
The genus Archidium includes 35 species (this list may be incomplete):
Archidium acanthophyllum  
 Archidium alternifolium
Archidium andersonianum
 Archidium donnellii
 Archidium elatum, Dixon & Sainsbury
 Archidium hallii
 Archidium minus
 Archidium minutissimum
Archidium muellerianum
 Archidium ohioense
 Archidium stellatum
 Archidium tenerrimum
Archidium wattsii

References

External links
 
 

Moss genera
Bryopsida
Taxonomy articles created by Polbot